Manuil Vasilyevich Ozerov was a Russian Counter Admiral during the early 20th century. He was known for commanding the Sissoi Veliky during the Battle of Tsushima and was one of the few officers who managed to survive the battle.

Military career
Manuil was born on October 15, 1852 at the village of Belmovo at the Tula Governorate. His father was Vasily Andreevich Ozerov who was of nobility, a court councilor and the head of the village while his mother was Evpraksia Vasilievna Spolokhov. He proceeded to enter the Naval Cadet Corps and graduated as a Garde de la Marine at the 5th Naval Crew on April 17, 1871. He was promoted to michman on May 8, 1873 and seconded to the Naval College on October 4, 1874. Ozerov received his first command on the auditor Ne Tron' Menya from November 3, 1876 to March 27, 1880 while being promoted to lieutenant on January 1, 1877. His next command was the monitor Uragan on 1880 and was made commander of the economic company on October 30, 1881. On May 20, 1883, he became the inspector for the Minin which was serving on the Pacific Ocean but was decommissioned on November 26, 1884 due to familial reasons. Ozerov returned on December 15, 1884 and was assigned to the Black Sea Fleet and assigned to the 1st Naval Crew of the fleet 4 days later. From June 6, 1887 to October 30, 1887 and February 15, 1888 to August 13, 1890, he was the acting senior officer aboard the Chernomorets and briefly acted as a senior officer of the steamer Eriklik from October 30, 1887 to February 15, 1888.

Ozerov was promoted to Captain 2nd Rank on April 1, 1890 and received command of the Dvenadsat Apostolov from August 13 to October 1, 1890 before returning to the Chernomorets from October 1, 1890 to October 12. He was then made the assistant commander of the 1st Naval Crew from October 31, 1890 to April 16, 1891 before being made the head of the musicians of the 31st Naval Crew on April 23, 1892. On January 1, 1893, he received command of the Ingul but was transferred to the Baltic Fleet at the 35th Naval Crew on January 1, 1885. Ozerov continued with his musical career as he headed the choir of port musicians from September 27, 1892 to April 26, 1894 but was transferred to the coastal defense battleship Novgorod on January 1, 1885. Ozerov then became the Junior assistant commander of Kronstadt from May 15, 1895 to December 16, 1896 and was transferred to the transport Samoyed on December 16, 1897. He was promoted to Captain 1st Rank on December 6, 1898 and was made flag-captain of the costal headquarters of the 2nd Naval Division on January 4, 1899 and the flag captain of the commander of the training squadron of the Baltic Sea on April 3, 1899.

On December 6, 1899, he was given command of the General-Admiral and was enrolled to the 11th Naval Crew on January 19, 1900. From August 24, 1900 to June 7, 1902, he served on the Poltava and command of the 13th Naval Crew from April 16, 1903 to March 28, 1904. After being given command of the Sissoi Veliky since September 9, 1902, he went on to participate at the Battle of Tsushima but after the ship was sunk, he was taken prisoner. Ozerov then took up maritime piloting as he became commander of the lightship London and promoted to Counter Admiral on November 5, 1907 but retired by 1909. Ozerov died on November 6, 1919 at the town of Belev and was buried at the Belevsky Spaso-Preobrazhensky Monastery.

Awards
Order of Saint Stanislaus, III Class (January 1, 1878)
Order of Saint Anna, III Class (January 1, 1887)
Order of Saint Stanislaus, II Class (January 1, 1892)
Order of Saint Anna, II Class (December 6, 1894)
Order of Saint Vladimir, IV Class with bow (1894) for 25 operations
Order of Saint Vladimir, III Class (March 28, 1904)
Order of Saint Vladimir II Class with swords (January 8, 1907)

Foreign Awards
: Order of the Redeemer, Commander's Cross (1901)

References

1852 births
1919 deaths
People from Tula Governorate
Imperial Russian Navy admirals
Russian military personnel of the Russo-Japanese War
Recipients of the Order of St. Anna, 2nd class
Recipients of the Order of St. Anna, 3rd class
Recipients of the Order of St. Vladimir, 2nd class
Recipients of the Order of St. Vladimir, 3rd class
Recipients of the Order of St. Vladimir, 4th class
Recipients of the Order of Saint Stanislaus (Russian), 2nd class
Recipients of the Order of Saint Stanislaus (Russian), 3rd class
Naval Cadet Corps alumni